The 1949 Giro d'Italia was the 32nd Giro d'Italia, organized and sponsored by the newspaper La Gazzetta dello Sport. The race was won by Fausto Coppi of the Bianchi team, with fellow Italians Gino Bartali and Giordano Cottur coming in second and third respectively.

Coppi won the overall by way of the memorable 17th stage (from Cuneo to Pinerolo), in which he escaped from the group and climbed alone the Maddalena Pass, the Col de Vars, the Col d'Izoard, the Col de Montgenèvre and the Sestriere Pass, arriving in Pinerolo 11'52" ahead of Bartali, his tenacious antagonist during those years.

Teams

A total of 15 teams were invited to participate in the 1949 Giro d'Italia. Each team sent a squad of seven riders, so the Giro began with a peloton of 105 cyclists. Out of the 105 riders that started this edition of the Giro d'Italia, a total of 65 riders made it to the finish in Monza.

The teams entering the race were:

Bianchi

Edelweiss
Fiorelli
Fréjus
Ganna
Legnano

Pre-race favorites

The main favorites entering the race were Gino Bartali and Fausto Coppi. Vito Ortelli, who placed fourth the year prior did not participate as he was suffering from an illness and stayed home. l'Unità'''s Attilio Camoriano wrote that Coppi's form entering the race could allow him to gain the lead early on and hold it from Bartali, who was known to take several stages to warm up and adjust to the race. Camoriano added that Bartali would likely not let that happen as he was known to find strength and referenced previous Tours de France. He further stated that Coppi's Bianchi team was stronger and better organized than Bartali's eponymous team. Aside from the aforementioned contenders, Fiorelli's Jean Goldschmit was thought to be the team's best contender as Ganna–Ursus's Albert Dubuisson was known to fade on climbs.

Route and stages

The route for this edition of the Giro d'Italia was announced on 7 February 1949. The stages involving the Piedmont region were finalized on 24 March. The race was scheduled to begin at 8 am at the Villa Giulia in Palermo. Attilio Camoriano of l'Unità'' stated that the riders were likely to use their heavy, thicker tires because after the Santo Stefano junction, the roads contained lava rocks from Mount Etna throughout and those were known to cut tires easily. The Sicilian government offered race organizers ten million lire to host the start of the Giro.

Prior to the start of the race, bandit Salvatore Giuliano who had been on the run near Sicily's Montelepre was being searched for by police as the area was in a state of emergency for several weeks. It was rumored that Giuliano threatened to line the race route in the mountains and shoot at the participants with machine guns if the police did not call off their search for him. Specifically Giuliano threatened to interrupt the first stage along its route from Palermo to Catania. Due to these threats, there were discussions to cancel the two planned stages in Sicily, but the stages remained. Instead, the normal police escort for the Giro d'Italia caravan that travels with the race would be increased from 6 to 10 cars and cars would not be allowed to stop along the route throughout the two stages on the island except in cases of "force majeure." The added police were not due to the rumors of the attack, but allegedly to prevent a potential escape by Giuliano.

Classification leadership

In the 1949 Giro d'Italia there were two major classifications. For the general classification, calculated by adding each cyclist's finishing times on each stage, and allowing time bonuses for the first three finishers on mass-start stages, the leader received a pink jersey. This classification was considered the most important of the Giro d'Italia, and the winner was considered the winner of the Giro.

In the mountains classifications, points were won by reaching the top of a climb before other cyclists. This classification did not award a jersey to the leader. The highest climb of the race was the Col d'Izoard in stage seventeen, which was 2360m. The other stages that included categorized climbs were stages: 1, 3, 11, 13, 14, 15, 17, and 19.

A white jersey was awarded to the rider from a non-major "industrial" team with the lowest total time."

There was a black jersey (maglia nera) awarded to the rider placed last in the general classification. The classification was calculated in the same manner as the general classification.

There was a classification for sprints called the "Gran Premio Tappe Volanti" classification. This consisted of a sprint line that was marked in eight stages of the race, stages 2, 4, 7, 8, 9, 12, 14, and 19. Specifically the eight sprints were located in the following places Taormina, Castrovillari, Terni, Ferrara, Trieste, Verona, Chiavari, and Novara, respectively.

For placing in the top three for each classification, on the final stage placings, the "Gran Premio Tappe Volanti", or crossing a categorized climb for the mountains classification, time bonuses were awarded. One minute time bonus was given to the first placed rider, thirty seconds to second place, and fifteen second to third.

Final standings

General classification

Independent rider classification

Mountains classification

Team classification

Intermediate sprints classification

References

 
1949
Giro d'Italia
Giro d'Italia
Giro d'Italia
Giro d'Italia
Giro d'Italia